Eye Contact is the sixth solo album by musician Bob Welch released in 1983.

Track listing
 "American Girls" (Bob Welch, Steve Diamond) – 2:47
 "S.O.S" (Welch, Jeff Baxter) – 2:54
 "Bernadette" (Welch) – 2:55
 "He's Really Got A Hold On Her" (Ronald Brooks, Gary Harrison, Daniel Keen) – 3:17
 "Don't Let Me Touch You" (Welch, Diamond) – 2:53
 "I'll Dance Alone" (Mark Holden, Peter Hamilton) – 4:00
 "Fever" (Welch) – 3:10
 "Stay" (Welch, Baxter) – 2:58
 "Love On The Line" (Welch) – 3:47
 "Can't Hold Your Love Back" (Welch) – 3:39

Bonus tracks on 2012 Wounded Bird reissue

 "I'll Dance Alone" (single version) – 3:34
 "Fever" (single remix) – 2:59
 "Fever" (12" version) – 5:29

Personnel

Musicians
 Bob Welch – vocals, guitar
 Nathan East – bass
 Jeffrey Baxter – guitars, synthesizers
 Jim Ehinger – piano, synthesizers
 James S. King – synthesizers
 Jerry Peterson – saxophone
 Ed Greene – drums
 Tommy Funderburk – background vocals
 Carl Wilson – background vocals
 Al Jardine – background vocals
 Myrna Smith-Schilling – background vocals
 Paulette McWilliams – background vocals
 Van Redding – background vocals

Technical

 Jeff Baxter – producer
 Leon Lecash – photography

1983 albums
Bob Welch (musician) albums
RCA Records albums